Zenzo Moyo (born 24 December 1975) is a retired Zimbabwean football striker.

References 

1975 births
Living people
Zimbabwean footballers
Zimbabwe international footballers
Association football forwards
Zimbabwean expatriate footballers
Expatriate footballers in Cyprus
Zimbabwean expatriate sportspeople in Cyprus
Expatriate footballers in Greece
Zimbabwean expatriate sportspeople in Greece
Expatriate footballers in Botswana
Zimbabwean expatriate sportspeople in Botswana
Highlanders F.C. players
AEP Paphos FC players
Olympiakos Nicosia players
Atromitos F.C. players
Gilport Lions F.C. players
Cypriot First Division players
Super League Greece players